Suffolk Meadows was a quarter horse racing facility on Long Island that operated during 1977 and 1986. The racetrack was situated on a  parcel located in Yaphank northwest of the William Floyd Parkway interchange on the Long Island Expressway.

The racetrack first opened in 1977 as Parr Meadows and closed following a 113-day meet after the bank defaulted on loans. Although the track was not built by developer Ron Parr, the Parr Organization assumed ownership after the original builder ran out of funds. In May 1986, horse racing briefly returned to Suffolk Meadows for an 86-day stint. The racetrack ceased operations on October 18, 1986.

On September 7, 1979, 18,000 attendees gathered at Parr Meadows for a ten-hour concert featuring a number of the original performers from the Woodstock Festival. Musical artists attending the tenth year reunion concert included Blondie Chaplin, Canned Heat, Country Joe McDonald, John Sebastian, Leslie West, Jorma Kaukonen, Johnny Winter, Paul Butterfield, Rick Danko and Stephen Stills. Many of the concertgoers arrived the day before, parking along William Floyd Parkway and camping out in the woods.

Suffolk Meadows has also been the site of competitions for the International Professional Rodeo Association and the Suffolk County Fair. The former racetrack site has also been discussed as a potential location of a casino for the Shinnecock Indian Nation. In 1997, developer Wilbur Breslin planned to develop the adjacent property into a regional shopping mall called Brookhaven Town Center.

A Super Walmart is currently under construction on the site; it is expected to open by November 2021.

References

External links
Suffolk Meadows at LI Oddities

Brookhaven, New York
Defunct horse racing venues in New York (state)
1977 establishments in New York (state)
Sports venues in Long Island
1986 disestablishments in New York (state)
Sports venues completed in 1977
Sports venues in Suffolk County, New York